CHUB-FM (105.5 FM, BIG 105) is a radio station in Red Deer, Alberta. Owned by the Jim Pattison Group, it broadcasts a hot adult contemporary format.

History 
The station originally began broadcasting as CKRD at 1230 kHz/AM in 1949. In 1954, CKRD moved from 1230 to 850 AM and moved to its last AM frequency at 700 AM in 1985, until it moved to its current FM frequency at 105.5 in 2000 with the current callsign, CHUB.

References

External links 
 
 

Hub
Hub
Hub
Radio stations established in 1949
1949 establishments in Alberta